Tourism in Bhutan began in 1974, when the Government of Bhutan, in an effort to raise revenue and to promote Bhutanese unique culture and traditions to the outside world, opened its isolated country to foreigners. In 1974 a total of 287 tourists visited the Kingdom of Bhutan. The number of tourists visiting Bhutan increased to 2,850 in 1992, and rose dramatically to 7,158 in 1999. By the late 1980s tourism contributed over US$2 million in annual revenue.

Though open to foreigners, the Bhutanese government is acutely aware of the environmental impact tourists can have on Bhutan's unique and virtually unspoiled landscape and culture. Accordingly, they have restricted the level of tourist activity from the start, preferring higher-quality tourism. Initially, this policy was known as "high value, low volume" tourism. It was renamed in 2008 as "high value, low impact", "a subtle but significant shift". While the low impact is guaranteed through the low number of visitors, it is a requirement to be wealthy to travel Bhutan, which leaves room for criticism and the question whether one has to be wealthy to be a "high value tourist". For tourists a US$ 200 per person per day fee is imposed. In 2005 a document called "Sustainable Tourism Development Strategy" "placed greater emphasis on increasing tourist numbers by using the country's culture and environment to promote Bhutan as an exotic niche destination attractive to wealthy tourists". The most important centres for tourism are in Bhutan's capital, Thimphu, and in the western city of Paro, Taktshang, a cliff-side monastery (called the "Tiger's Nest" in English) overlooking the Paro Valley, is one of the country's attractions. This temple is sacred to Buddhists. Housed inside the temple is a cave in which the Buddhist Deity who brought Buddhism to Bhutan meditated for 90 days in order to spread Buddhism. The temple has been standing for well over a thousand years.

Travel Operators in Bhutan 

The Bhutanese government privatised the Bhutan Tourism Corporation (BTC) in October 1991, facilitating private-sector investment and activity.  As a result,  over 75 licensed tourist companies operate in the country. Previously, all tourists (group or individual) must travel on a planned, prepaid, guided package-tour or according to a custom-designed travel-program. Potential tourists must make arrangements through an officially approved tour operator, either directly or through an overseas agent.

Visa to Bhutan 
Bhutan's tourism policy was further revised in June 2022 to maintain its 'High Value, Low Volume' policy and all nationalities has to pay US$200 in Sustainable Development Fee per night to avail a visa to Bhutan, while Indian nationals has to pay 1,200 INR to avail a permit. Henceforth, travellers are allowed to arrange their own accommodations and itinerary when travelling in the country.

Almost all nationalities need to pre-arrange their visa or permit prior to visiting Bhutan based on updated visa policy of Bhutan

Airlines 

Druk Air, founded in 1981, used to be the only airline operating flights in Bhutan, until the liberazation of the aviation industry with the introduction of Bhutan Airlines in December 2011.

Arrivals by country
Most visitors arriving to Bhutan on a short-term basis were from the following countries of nationality: In 2019, the country saw its highest tourist arrival yet at more than 315,000 people. The growth was boosted by the Asia-Pacific market, notably from India, Thailand, Vietnam, Philippines, Australia, Japan, China, Singapore, Bangladesh, Malaysia and South Korea. Western markets also increased, notably from the United States, United Kingdom, Germany, and France. 

Most visitors arriving to Bhutan were from the following countries of nationality:

UNESCO Tentative List of Bhutan
In 2012, Bhutan formally listed its tentative sites to the UNESCO World Heritage Centre. It was the first time Bhutan listed its sites to the organization for future inclusion. Eight sites were listed, located in various properties throughout the country.

Criticism of the "High Quality, Low Volume" Principle
While Bhutan is successful in limiting the numbers of tourists who enter the country, with its principle of "High Quality, Low Volume" it can be argued, that a "high quality tourist" needs to be a wealthy tourist, because the hurdle of visiting Bhutan is mainly posed by the high pricing and not by actual interest or mindfulness.

See also

 Transport in Bhutan
 Visa policy of Bhutan
 Trans Bhutan Trail

References

External links
 
 Tourism Council of Bhutan (Official Website)
 Bhutan Tourism Official website
 Drukair, Royal Bhutan Airlines

 Tourism in Bhutan
Bhutan